The Thomaston Central Historic District is a historic district in the town of Thomaston, Alabama, United States.  Thomaston was founded in 1901, the same year that the B.S. & N.O. Railroad, now CSX Transportation, went through the town.  The historic district features examples of Queen Anne and Colonial Revival architecture and is roughly bounded by Chestnut Street, Sixth Avenue, Seventh Avenue, Short Street, and the railroad.

References

National Register of Historic Places in Marengo County, Alabama
Historic districts in Marengo County, Alabama
Colonial Revival architecture in Alabama
Queen Anne architecture in Alabama
Historic districts on the National Register of Historic Places in Alabama